Sally G. Bagshaw is an American politician and former member of the Seattle City Council. She was first elected in 2009 after winning in the nonpartisan primary election and defeating David Bloom in the general election with 69 percent of the vote. Prior her election, she had been the chief civil deputy prosecutor in the King County Prosecuting Attorney's Office for eight years under Norm Maleng.

Electoral history

2009 election

2013 election

2015 election

References

1951 births
Living people
Seattle City Council members
Lawyers from Portland, Oregon
Women city councillors in Washington (state)
21st-century American women politicians
21st-century American politicians